Helmut Förnbacher (born 26 January 1936) is a Swiss actor, film director and screenwriter. He has appeared in more than 70 films and television shows since 1959. He starred in the 1976 film The Sudden Loneliness of Konrad Steiner, which was entered into the 26th Berlin International Film Festival.

Selected filmography
 Hinter den sieben Gleisen (1959), as Paul Eberhard
 Stage Fright (1960), as Thomas Crusius
 Tread Softly (1965), as Percy
 No Shooting Time for Foxes (1966), as the main character
 Murderers Club of Brooklyn (1967), as Bryan Dyers
  (1967), as Helmut
  (1968, director), as Kurt Sandweg
 Köpfchen in das Wasser, Schwänzchen in die Höh (1969, director), as Berger
 Love, Vampire Style (1970, director)
  (1974, TV film), as Godfrey Ablewhite
 The Sudden Loneliness of Konrad Steiner (1976), as Peter
 Akte Grüninger (2013), as Valentin Keel

References

External links

1936 births
Living people
Swiss male film actors
Swiss male television actors
20th-century Swiss male actors
21st-century Swiss male actors
Swiss film directors
Swiss screenwriters
Male screenwriters
German-language film directors